The Banker's House is a historic home located at 319 N. Lafayette St. in Shelby, Cleveland County, North Carolina.  It was designed by architect G.S.H. Appleget, and was built in 1874–1875.  It is a -story, T-shaped, stuccoed brick house in the Second Empire style.  It features a -story tower, with mansard roofs on the tower and main block.  Also on the property is a contributing wellhouse and a one-story brick outbuilding.

It was listed on the National Register of Historic Places in 1975.

References

Houses on the National Register of Historic Places in North Carolina
Second Empire architecture in North Carolina
Houses completed in 1875
Houses in Cleveland County, North Carolina
National Register of Historic Places in Cleveland County, North Carolina